Telestes pleurobipunctatus is a species of ray-finned fish in the family Cyprinidae.
It is found only in Greece.
Its natural habitats are rivers and intermittent rivers.
It is threatened by habitat loss.

References

Telestes
Fish described in 1939
Taxonomy articles created by Polbot
Taxa named by Alexander I. Stephanidis